Opatovce nad Nitrou is a village and municipality in Prievidza District in the Trenčín Region of western Slovakia.

History
In historical records the village was first mentioned in 1113.

Geography
The municipality lies at an altitude of 270 metres and covers an area of 9.17 km². It has a population of about 1,453 people.

Graphical Model of Chapel
The chapelle in Opatovce nad Nitrou
 http://serm.szm.sk/gsvm/index.html

Graphical Model of church
The church in Opatovce nad Nitrou
 http://serm.szm.sk/upg/index.html

External links
 
 
 http://www.statistics.sk/mosmis/eng/run.html

Villages and municipalities in Prievidza District